Jae-beom, also spelled Jae-bum, is a Korean masculine given name. Its meaning differs based on the hanja used to write each syllable of the name. There are 20 hanja with the reading "jae" and 13 hanja with the reading "beom" on the South Korean government's official list of hanja which may be registered for use in given names.

People with this name include:
Yim Jae-beom (born 1963), South Korean rock ballad singer
Shin Che-bon (born 1971), South Korean footballer
Brian Tee (born Jaebeom Takata, 1977), American actor of Japanese and Korean descent
Park Jae-bum (golfer) (born 1982), South Korean golfer
Kim Jae-bum (born 1985), South Korean judo practitioner
Jay Park (Korean name Park Jaebeom, born 1987), American singer and dancer of Korean descent
Jay B (born Lim Jae-beom, 1994), South Korean singer, member of boy band Got7

See also
List of Korean given names

References

Korean masculine given names